Dan Griffiths may refer to:

 Dan Griffiths (rugby union, born 1857) (1857–1936), Welsh rugby union forward
 Dan Griffiths (rugby union, born 1979), Welsh rugby union fly-half